Pascale Boyer (born 28 September 1965) is a French politician representing La République En Marche! She was elected to the French National Assembly on 18 June 2017, representing Hautes-Alpes's 1st constituency.

See also
 2017 French legislative election

References

1965 births
Living people
Deputies of the 15th National Assembly of the French Fifth Republic
La République En Marche! politicians
21st-century French women politicians
People from Saint-Mandé
Politicians from Île-de-France
Women members of the National Assembly (France)
Deputies of the 16th National Assembly of the French Fifth Republic